Bernd-Ulrich Hergemöller is a German historian.

References

External links 
 
 hergemoeller.de

20th-century German historians
21st-century German historians
German medievalists
Historians of LGBT topics
German LGBT writers
German LGBT rights activists
LGBT historians
Living people
1950 births
Writers from Münster
German male non-fiction writers
21st-century LGBT people